North Harbour is a suburb on the North Shore of Auckland, New Zealand. It is located 12 kilometres north of the city centre, to the south of the suburb of Albany. The suburb has not been officially designated as a suburb by Auckland Council, the territorial authority. The place name holds no official status with the New Zealand Geographic Board, nor is it used by New Zealand Post. North Harbour is, however, a statistical area used in Statistics New Zealand datasets and North Harbour East and North Harbour West are area units. The general area that embodies what is referred to as the suburb of North Harbour is made up of parts of Albany, Rosedale, Schanpper Rock and Pinehill.

The business and light industrial area of Rosedale was given the name North Harbour Industrial Estate when construction commenced on it in the 1990s. The former North Shore City Council the changed the name of this area back to Rosedale in 2009, as a result of a broader review of suburb names and boundaries in the North Shore. This area is sometimes referred to by the former name. Business North Harbour, the association responsible for the area's business improvement district, retains the place name of North Harbour in their name. Business North Harbour was unhappy with the name change to Rosedale, describing the name as a "stinker" due to the association with the Rosedale Wastewater Treatment Plant and former landfill located in the suburb. Some businesses in Rosedale use North Harbour in their names and as the suburb in their addresses.

The name "North Harbour" also has a more general usage referring to all those parts of the Auckland conurbation sited to the north of the Waitemata Harbour, which includes the entirety of the former North Shore City (including Hibiscus Coast), plus parts of the former Waitakere City. The name thus applied finds its most common usage when referring to the North Harbour Rugby Union, which plays in the ITM Cup, or North Harbour Stadium in Albany, the home ground of the rugby union.

Demographics

North Harbour had a population of 816 at the 2018 New Zealand census, an increase of 252 people (44.7%) since the 2013 census, and an increase of 366 people (81.3%) since the 2006 census. There were 276 households, comprising 432 males and 387 females, giving a sex ratio of 1.12 males per female. The median age was 38.7 years (compared with 37.4 years nationally), with 84 people (10.3%) aged under 15 years, 186 (22.8%) aged 15 to 29, 366 (44.9%) aged 30 to 64, and 183 (22.4%) aged 65 or older.

Ethnicities were 64.7% European/Pākehā, 5.9% Māori, 1.1% Pacific peoples, 29.0% Asian, and 4.0% other ethnicities. People may identify with more than one ethnicity.

The percentage of people born overseas was 45.2, compared with 27.1% nationally.

Although some people chose not to answer the census's question about religious affiliation, 52.6% had no religion, 37.5% were Christian, 2.2% were Hindu, 1.8% were Muslim, 1.5% were Buddhist and 1.5% had other religions.

Of those at least 15 years old, 192 (26.2%) people had a bachelor's or higher degree, and 93 (12.7%) people had no formal qualifications. The median income was $34,900, compared with $31,800 nationally. 117 people (16.0%) earned over $70,000 compared to 17.2% nationally. The employment status of those at least 15 was that 381 (52.0%) people were employed full-time, 84 (11.5%) were part-time, and 15 (2.0%) were unemployed.

Education
It was opened in 2005. Albany Senior High School opened in Albany in 2009 for year 11-13 students.

Notes

Suburbs of Auckland
North Shore, New Zealand